Ukraine on Fire is a documentary film directed by Igor Lopatonok and premiered at the 2016 Taormina Film Fest. It features Oliver Stone, the executive producer, interviewing pro-Russian figures surrounding the 2014 Ukrainian revolution such as Viktor Yanukovich and Vladimir Putin. The film portrays the events that led to the flight of Yanukovych in February 2014 as a coup d'état orchestrated by the USA with the help of far-right Ukrainian factions. The film's central thesis is that the USA had used Ukraine as a proxy against Russia for many years. It also claims that a large and influential section of Ukrainian fighters in the Maidan uprising were neo-Nazis.

Synopsis
The film starts with a historical overview, detailing events such as the Cossack Hetmanate, World War I and the Brest-Litovsk Treaty, the incorporation of Western Ukraine into the USSR, the "Great Patriotic War", Ukrainian collaborationism in World War II, the events in Babi Yar, the Volyn massacre and the guerilla war of the Ukrainian Insurgent Army up to the mid 1950s. 

The film mentions that during the Cold War, the CIA maintained contact with Ukrainian nationalists in order to have possible channels for counterintelligence towards the USSR. The film presents figures such as Mykola Lebed, Stepan Bandera, Dmytro Dontsov, Andriy Melnyk and Roman Shukhevych, who were important in the nationalist movement. 

It then covers the development in Ukraine since the collapse of the Soviet Union in the "crazy 1990s". It argues that the free market economy gave rise to a small class of oligarchs who acquired vast wealth and power, while leaving the majority of the population in poverty. However, the documentary does not provide data or analysis to support this critique. 

A big part of the documentary is dedicated to recounting the development of far-right politics in Ukraine. It talks about how in 1991, Oleh Tyahnybok founded the radical national party Svoboda. Dmytro Yarosh founded another far-right organization Trysub (Trident) in 1994, which later merged into Right Sector. 

The film discusses the Orange Revolution of 2004, which saw the election of west-leaning Viktor Yushchenko over Viktor Yanukovych (east-leaning) after a repeat election due to widespread electoral fraud. It also covers the events leading up to the 2014 Maidan protests, including the negotiations over a trade agreement with the European Union, the role of NGOs, and the appearance of US politicians such as Chris Murphy and John McCain. The documentary claims that the Maidan protests, initially peaceful, began to escalate with the involvement of radical elements, including Right Sector activists who were brought to the Maidan to "muscle" the peaceful demonstrations.

The historical retrospective is followed by Oliver Stone's interviews with Viktor Yanukovych and Vladimir Putin, in which they explain the situation in 2013 regarding the trade agreement with the European Union and why negotiations were paused. However, no western perspective is discussed regarding the trade agreement. The film also covers the events leading up to Yanukovych's overthrow, including the escalation of violence on both sides and the agreement mediated by the foreign ministers of France, Germany, and Poland that was not seen as binding by Right Sector activists. The film argues that the impeachment procedure concerning Yanukovych was not in accordance with the constitution, as the required three-quarters majority of 450 members of parliament was not met.

The documentary also discusses the annexation of Crimea by Russia and the ongoing conflict in eastern Ukraine, as well as several events that increased the tensions between the United States and Russia, such as the downing of the airliner MH 17 over the civil war zone in eastern Ukraine. The film highlights the role of NATO's eastward expansion and the concerns of Russia, and also raises questions about the legitimacy of the new government in Kiev and the imposition of sanctions against Russia.

The documentary concludes by presenting the concept of the Doomsday Clock, which indicated a high level of global risk in 2015 due to the modernization of nuclear arsenals. Overall, the film provides a historical account of Ukraine and its ongoing struggles from Putin's perspective, and raises questions about the involvement of foreign powers in Ukrainian politics.

Release
The film premiered at the Taormina Film Festival in Italy on 16 June 2016; thereafter, it did not receive a general theatrical release but was published as DVD on 18 July 2017. Later, the documentary became also available in the video on demand market via Apple TV and Amazon Prime and since June 2021 also on YouTube.

In March 2022, it was reported that the documentary had been removed from YouTube and Vimeo. YouTube explained they "removed this video for violating our violent or graphic content policy, which prohibits content containing footage of corpses with massive injuries, such as severed limbs"; subsequently, the film was uploaded to Rumble for free viewing. As of 12 March 2022, the documentary was again available on YouTube, this time with a content warning attached.

Reception
Rod Dreher, writing for the American Conservative, gave this impression: "I expected 'Ukraine On Fire' to be propaganda, and indeed it was. But that doesn't mean it is entirely a lie, and in any case, it's important to know how the other side regards a conflict, if only to understand how they are likely thinking." He confirmed that some NGO are in the political change business as seen personally observed in Hungary and argues against a black hat vs. white hat interpretation of the situation. According to his assessment, the argument by Mearsheimer and Kennan, that the West has pushed Ukraine and Russia towards an escalating crisis, needs some consideration (not full endorsement) in order to understand the complexity of the situation.

Andrew Roth, writing from Moscow for The Guardian, observed that Ukraine on Fire is part of "a series of documentary projects featuring Stone about Russia and Ukraine that reflect a strongly pro-Kremlin worldview", remarking further that "Stone has noted that the films, which are strongly critical of the 2014 maidan revolution and have been attacked as propaganda vehicles, are very popular in Russia."

, University of Toronto's 'Chair of Ukrainian Studies', writer for Kyiv Post, and author of several books on Ukrainian history, strongly criticized Stone's pro-Russian bias. He suggested to "peruse Karen Dawisha’s book Putin's Kleptocracy (2013) and some of Andrew Wilson’s and Timothy Snyder’s books on Ukraine". While Velychenko does not deny the possible involvement of the CIA and assesses that this is to be expected in normal international relations, he allocates only a minor role to them compared to domestic political forces and argues that the focus on external forces only will lead to apologetics or conspiracy theories.

Antonio Armano, an Italian journalist covering Eastern Europe, criticized that the film does not mention either Stalin's dekulakization or the Holodomor,, a famine caused by Soviet policies  that killed millions of Ukrainians. These events may explain why the Nazi occupation during World War II was seen by some Ukrainians as welcomed liberation. Comparing Ukraine on Fire with the documentary Winter on Fire released one year earlier (and portrayed the 2014 revolution positively), he stated that Ukraine on Fire is a "less narrative and emotional" journalistic product, while Winter on Fire is "hagiographic, partial and a bit naïve", but manages to stay out of the realm of conspiracies. According to Armano, the main message of Ukraine on Fire is to avoid a new Cold War between the United States and Russia with the potential for nuclear confrontation.

James Kirchick of The Daily Beast called the documentary a "dictator suckup", noting that "Yanukovych ceased being president on 22 February 2014 because he fled Kiev, rendering himself incapable of performing his presidential duties under the Ukrainian constitution. Over three-quarters of the country’s parliament, including many members of Yanukovych’s own party, voted effectively to impeach him that day", and "It is astoundingly patronizing for Stone to lecture Ukrainians—thousands of whom have fought and died defending their dismembered country from an all-out invasion by their much more powerful neighbor—about what they do and do not know about Viktor Yanukovych, Russia and the potential for a new Cold War".

Pavel Shekhtman, a Russian dissident wanted by Russian authorities on charges of extremism, also called the documentary "undistilled Kremlin propaganda", arguing among others that from the main Ukrainian political figures described as neo-Nazis by Oliver Stone, only Oleh Tyahnybok resorted to xenophobia and anti-Semitic rhetoric. Tyahnybok's ultranationalist party, Svoboda, subsequently lost most of their seats in the 2014 Ukrainian parliamentary election.

See also
 Winter on Fire: Ukraine's Fight for Freedom
 93: Battle for Ukraine

References

External links
 
 Full length version of the film on Vimeo courtesy of the film-makers
 YouTube version

2016 films
2016 documentary films
American documentary films
Documentary films about revolutions
Documentary films about Ukraine
Euromaidan
Films produced by Oliver Stone
Russo-Ukrainian War films
2010s English-language films
2010s American films
Anti-Ukrainian sentiment
Nazi analogies